This is a list of governors for Stockholm County of Sweden. Stockholm County separated from Uppland County, the first time from 1641 to 1654, and then finally in 1719. The City of Stockholm was separately governed by the Governor of Stockholm until 1967, when it was integrated into Stockholm County. The governors reside in Tessin Palace.

Governors

First period

Second period

Including the City of Stockholm

Footnotes

References

External links
www.lansstyrelsen.se/stockholm

Stockholm

Governors of Stockholm County
Stockholm County